|}

This is a list of Legislative Council results for the Victorian 1992 state election. 22 of the 44 seats were contested.

Results by province

Ballarat

Central Highlands

Chelsea

Doutta Galla

East Yarra

Eumemmerring

Geelong

Gippsland

Higinbotham

Jika Jika

Koonung

Melbourne

Melbourne North

Melbourne West

Monash

North Eastern

North Western

Silvan

South Eastern

Templestowe

Waverley

Western

See also 

 1992 Victorian state election
 Members of the Victorian Legislative Council, 1992–1996

References 

Results of Victorian state elections